Eduard Johan Bermúdez Salas (born August 21, 1984 in Maracaibo) is a Venezuelan light-flyweight amateur boxer who competed at the 2008 Summer Olympics. He has his debut to local boxer Zou Shiming.

External links
 ESPN Profile
 

1984 births
Living people
Sportspeople from Maracaibo
Venezuelan male boxers
Olympic boxers of Venezuela
Boxers at the 2008 Summer Olympics
Boxers at the 2015 Pan American Games
South American Games silver medalists for Venezuela
South American Games medalists in boxing
Competitors at the 2006 South American Games
Light-flyweight boxers
Pan American Games competitors for Venezuela
20th-century Venezuelan people
21st-century Venezuelan people